Takeaki Amezawa (born 4 February 1995) is a Japanese former professional cyclist, who rode professionally between 2015 and 2020 for the ,  and  teams.

Major results
2016
 6th Tour de Okinawa
2017
 2nd Team time trial, Asian Road Championships
 3rd Japan Cup Cycle Road Race
2018
 1st Stage 2 Tour of Japan
 9th Overall Tour de Kumano

References

External links

1995 births
Living people
Japanese male cyclists
21st-century Japanese people